Yiannis Pachipis (born 3 February 1994) is a Cypriot footballer who plays for AEZ Zakakiou as a winger.

Career
A product of the AEL Limassol academy he regularly played as a winger for Olympiakos Nicosia for two seasons. In 2014–15 season he played for Karmiotissa Polemidion before returning to Olympiakos Nicosia in July 2015. In 2016, he joined AEZ Zakakiou in the Cypriot First Division before returning in 2017 to Olympiakos Nicosia until 2019.

In September 2021, Pachipis joined AEZ Zakakiou.

References

External links

1994 births
Living people
Cypriot footballers
Cyprus under-21 international footballers
Cyprus youth international footballers
Olympiakos Nicosia players
AEL Limassol players
Karmiotissa FC players
AEZ Zakakiou players
Alki Oroklini players
Aris Limassol FC players
Cypriot First Division players
Association football forwards